Shiloh, West Virginia may refer to the following places.

Shiloh, Hampshire County, West Virginia
Shiloh, Raleigh County, West Virginia
Shiloh, Tyler County, West Virginia